The Parish of Cowan, is a civil parish of the County of Cumberland.

The Parish is in the Hundred of Dundas and Hornsby Shire Council. The parish is on the Hawkesbury River.

Cowan is believed to be an Aboriginal word meaning 'opposite', 'other side'  or 'big water'. in the language of the Guringgai tribe, a Sydney Aboriginal Clan of the area.

Today much of the parish is National Park, though the towns of Cowan and Brooklyn, New South Wales are in the Parish.

The Sydney to Newcastle Freeway and Central Coast and Sydney to Newcastle Railway Lines pass through the Parish.

See also
Cowan, New South Wales
Hundred of Cowan South Australia

References

Parishes of Cumberland County